Aqsa Sutan Aswar (born 31 May 1997) is an Indonesian male jet skier. His elder brother Aero Sutan Aswar is also a jet skier who competes for Indonesia in international arena. He claimed a bronze medal in the men's runabout limited during the 2018 Asian Games while his elder brother Aero Sutan Aswar also claimed a bronze medal in the relevant event.

References 

1997 births
Living people
Indonesian jet skiers
Jet skiers at the 2018 Asian Games
Medalists at the 2018 Asian Games
Asian Games gold medalists for Indonesia
Asian Games bronze medalists for Indonesia
Asian Games medalists in jet skiing